This is a list of individuals who signed the American Geographical Society Fliers' & Explorers' Globe and date of signing:

2012 Fliers’ and Explorers’ Globe Signing Ceremony, 10 April 2012, St. Petersburg, Russian Federation:
 Alexei Leonov
 Valentina Tereshkova

2008 Fliers’ and Explorers’ Globe Signing Ceremony, 12 February 2008, Newark, Delaware:
 Lawson Brigham

2006 Fliers’ and Explorers’ Globe Signing Ceremony, 21 November 2006, Kalamazoo, Michigan:
 Mary Meader

2005 Fliers’ and Explorers’ Globe Signing Ceremony, 14 December 2005, New York City:
 Jennie Darlington

2004 Fliers and Explorers Globe Signing Ceremony, March 31, 2004, New York City:
 Bryan Allen
 William R. Anderson  
 Liv Arnesen  
 Ann Bancroft    
 Sylvia Earle  
 Edith Ronne  
 Junko Tabei  

2000 Fliers and Explorers Globe Signing Ceremony, 11 December 2000, New York City:
 Walter Pitman
 William Ryan 
 Brian Jones (aeronaut)
 Bertrand Piccard
 Don Walsh  
 Neil Armstrong

1937 Fliers' and Explorers' Globe Signing Ceremony:
 Valeri Chkalov
 Roald Amundsen
 William Anders 
 Fred Austin 
 Robert Bartlett 
 William Beebe 
 Alexander Belyakov 
 Maurice Bellonte 
 Russell Boardman 
 Frank Borman 
 Louise Arner Boyd 
 William S. Brock  
 Richard Byrd 
 Clarence Chamberlin 
 L. Cotte  
 Dieudonné Costes 
 Jacques De Sibour 
 Violette De Sibour
 Amelia Earhart  
 Hugo Eckener 
 Lincoln Ellsworth 
 Charles Evans  
 Harrison Finch 
 P Gaffney 
 Harold Gatty 
 John Glenn 
 Lawrence Gould 
 Keith Greenaway 
 Albert A. Hegenberger 
 Matthew Henson 
 Edmund Hillary 
 Herbert Hollick-Kenyon 
 Gunther von Huenefeld  
 Charles Kingsford Smith  
 Herman Koehl   
 Joseph Le Brix 
 Richard Light
 Charles Lindbergh  
 Jim Lovell 
 George Lowe 
 Harry Lynch  
 Harry Lyon 
 Lester Maitland 
 Jack L. Martin 
 James Mollison  
 Robert Cushman Murphy  
 Fridtjof Nansen 
 Erik Nelson  
 Raymond Orteig 
 Russell Owen 
 Robert Peary  
 Carl O. Petersen 
 John Polando 
 Wiley Post 
 Finn Ronne 
 Fred Roots 
 Vilhjalmur Stefansson  
 Wolfgang von Gronau 
 Leigh Wade 
 1928 - Hubert Wilkins 
 J. Tuzo Wilson 
 Walter Wood 
 James Wordie

References

External links
 American Geographical Society

American Geographical Society